The 2019 CS Ice Star was held in October 2019 in Minsk, Belarus. It was part of the 2019–20 ISU Challenger Series. Medals were awarded in the disciplines of men's singles, ladies' singles, and ice dance.

Entries 
The International Skating Union published the list of entries on September 24, 2019.

Changes to preliminary assignments

Results

Men

Ladies

Ice dance

References

Ice Star
CS Minsk-Arena Ice Star
2019 in Belarusian sport
International figure skating competitions hosted by Belarus